James Joseph Tunney (May 25, 1897 – November 7, 1978) was an American professional boxer who competed from 1915 to 1928. He held the world heavyweight title from 1926 to 1928, and the American light heavyweight title twice between 1922 and 1923. A highly technical boxer, Tunney had a five-fight light heavyweight rivalry with Harry Greb in which he won three, lost once, and drew once, though many ringside reporters believed Greb should have won the decision in their second meeting. Tunney also knocked out Georges Carpentier and defeated Jack Dempsey twice; first in 1926 and again in 1927. Tunney's successful title defense against Dempsey remains one of the most famous bouts in boxing history and is known as The Long Count Fight. He retired undefeated as a heavyweight after his victory over Tom Heeney in 1928, after which Tunney was named Fighter of the Year by The Ring magazine.

Early life
Tunney's mother, Mary Lydon from Culleen House, Gorthgarve, Kiltimagh, County Mayo, Ireland, immigrated to the United States after the Great Famine. She settled in New York City, where she met John Tunney, from Cill Aodain, Kiltimagh. They married after a short courtship. The Tunneys had seven children; one son was murdered around 1920, another was a New York Police Department detective from 1924 to 1951, dying in 1971. At an early age, Gene Tunney was inspired by President Theodore Roosevelt to become physically fit.

Career

Tunney fought some 68 official professional fights, losing only one, to Harry Greb, while fighting as a light heavyweight.  Tunney fought many other fights whose scoring was unofficial, judged by newspaper reporters. He also lost none of these "newspaper decisions."  He reported that he lost a second fight during World War I, a 10-round decision, to Tommy Loughran, as a Marine before he began his professional boxing career. Tunney was regarded as an extremely skillful boxer who excelled in defense. In addition to beating Dempsey, the most famous fighter of his era, Tunney defeated Tommy Gibbons, Georges Carpentier and many other fine boxers.

Already the U.S. Expeditionary Forces champion, Tunney spent the winter of 1921 as a lumberjack in northern Ontario for the J. R. Booth Company of Ottawa, without revealing he was a champion boxer. He explained this as "wanting the solitude and the strenuous labors of the woods to help condition himself for the career that appeared before him."

Tunney also had a brief acting career, starring in the movie The Fighting Marine in 1926. Unfortunately, no prints of this film are known to exist.

He was elected as Ring Magazine's first-ever Fighter of the Year in 1928 and later elected to the World Boxing Hall of Fame in 1980, the International Boxing Hall of Fame in 1990 and the United States Marine Corps Sports Hall of Fame in 2001.

Military career

Tunney enlisted the Marine Corps during World War I and served as Private with 11th Marine Regiment in France and later in Germany during the occupation of the Rhineland in 1919. He saw no combat and spent most of the war in the Marine boxing team, becoming U.S. Expeditionary Forces champion. Tunney was demobilized following the war, but remained in the Marine Corps Reserve, ultimately reaching the rank of Major in the Connecticut Naval Militia.

Following the United States entry into World War II, at the request of Navy Undersecretary James Forrestal, Tunney accepted a commission in the United States Naval Reserve as a lieutenant commander to set up a physical fitness program for student pilots. He headed the Navy's physical fitness programme for the duration of the war and also made an inspection trip to Hawaii and the surrounding area.

Tunney was consecutively promoted to the ranks of Commander and Captain and retired shortly following the War. For his wartime service, he was decorated with the Navy Commendation Medal and was awarded the American Defense Service Medal, American Campaign Medal, Asiatic Pacific Campaign Medal, World War II Victory Medal.  He also held the World War I Victory Medal with France Clasp, Army of Occupation of Germany Medal, and Marine Corps Good Conduct Medal for his World War I enlisted service.

Personal life
In 1928, Tunney married a wealthy socialite Mary "Polly" Lauder (April 24, 1907 – April 19, 2008). She  was born into the Lauder Greenway Family; her grandfather was billionaire George Lauder, a first cousin and business partner of industrialist and philanthropist Andrew Carnegie. According to a 2007 biography, Tunney promised Polly that he would quit boxing and defended his title only one more time after the second Dempsey fight, against Tom Heeney of New Zealand.

After Tunney's retirement, the couple lived in Stamford, Connecticut and raised four children. They had three sons: John Varick Tunney (1934–2018), who was a U.S. Representative and U.S. Senator from California from 1965 until 1977; Jonathan "Jay" Rowland Tunney of Stamford, Connecticut; and Gene Lauder Tunney (1931-2009), who became a lawyer and served as district attorney for Sonoma County, California, for 20 years. Their one daughter was Joan Tunney Wilkinson (1939-2008) of San Francisco, who was committed to McLean Hospital on June 6, 1970, after she murdered her husband, Lynn Carter Wilkinson Jr.

Previous to his marrying Polly Lauder, Tunney was sued in 1927 for breach of promise by Katherine King Fogarty.

Death
Tunney died on November 7, 1978, at the Greenwich Hospital in Connecticut at the age of eighty-one, after suffering from a circulation ailment. He was interred at Long Ridge Union Cemetery in Stamford, Connecticut.

Fighting style

Tunney was a thinking fighter who preferred to make a boxing match into a game of chess, which was not popular during the times when such sluggers as Jack Dempsey, Harry Greb and Mickey Walker were commanding center stage. Tunney's style was influenced by other noted boxing thinkers such as James J. Corbett and Benny Leonard. Nevertheless, it is incorrect to think of Tunney as a stick-and-move fighter in the Ali style. While Tunney's heavyweight fights against Gibbons, Carpentier, and Dempsey featured his fleet-footed movement and rapid-fire jabbing, his earlier bouts, especially the five against Harry Greb, demonstrated his vicious body punching and willingness to fight toe-to-toe. It was Benny Leonard who advised Tunney that the only way to beat Harry "The Human Windmill" Greb was to aim his punches at Greb's body rather than his head.

Always moving and boxing behind an excellent left jab, Tunney would study his opponents from the first bell. He generally preferred to stay outside and nullify any attacks, while using quick counters to keep the opponent off balance. In his fights against Jack Dempsey, today's viewer can see Tunney's style: hands held low for greater power, fast footwork that adjusts to every move his opponent makes and quick and accurate one-two style counter-punches with the left and right.

Tunney was never knocked out, while only ever being knocked down once, that in his second fight with Dempsey in the infamous Long Count. This makes him one of only five Heavyweight champions, alongside Rocky Marciano, Riddick Bowe, Sultan Ibragimov and Nicolai Valuev to retire without ever suffering a stoppage defeat. Tunney, along with Marciano, Lewis and Vitali Klitschko is one of four heavyweight champions to have retired as champion and to have ended their career with a win in a world title fight. Having avenged his only loss to Harry Greb, with whom he also drew), Tunney joins Ingemar Johansson, Rocky Marciano, Lennox Lewis and Riddick Bowe as the only five heavyweight champions to have retired while holding a victory over every opponent he faced as a professional (barring no-contests).

Publications
In 1932, Tunney published a book called A Man Must Fight, in which he gave comments on his career and boxing techniques.

The Tunney Cup
In 1928, the U.S. Marine Corps presented – as a sign of friendship – a challenge cup to the Corps of Royal Marines, in the hope it might be competed for by Royal Marines association football teams. The Royal Marines named the trophy the "Tunney Cup," in honor of then–USMC Captain Tunney, who, with Sergeant Major Charles R. Francis, presented the trophy on behalf of the U.S. Marine Corps.

Cultural references

Dean Martin and Jerry Lewis had a comedy routine in which Lewis (in boxing shorts and gear) states he's fight'n Gene Tierney (the actress). Martin corrects Lewis and suggests that he must mean "Gene Tunney." Lewis then quips "You fight who you wanna fight, I'm fight'n who I wanna fight, I'm fight'n Gene Tierney."

In the song She Twists the Knife Again from Richard Thompson's 1985 album Across a Crowded Room, describing the mismatched intensity in a strife-ladened relationship, Thompson writes: "I'm in a fist fight/She thinks she's Gene Tunney!"

He's also mentioned in Act 1 of Arthur Miller's Death of a Salesman: Willy tells his sons he has a punching bag with Tunney's signature on it.

Mentioned in "A Whistle in the Dark" (Act 1, pg. 31) by Tom Murphy : 'in the words of the great Gene Tunney, a man must fight back. His father was a Mayoman too'.

Mentioned in the short story "Fallon" by JD Luther, when imprisoned character Tyson Wayne Vance recalls his abusive father, "Was more than one night momma'd look like she went fifteen rounds with Gene Tunney...",

In the 1932 boxing film Winner Take All, James Cagney's character Jimmy Kane—a has-been former champion trying to get educated—laments that William Shakespeare was "the one who ruined Gene Tunney."

The novelette "A KO for Christmas" by Shawn Pollock features a character, Stitch Stanford, who hopes to fight Gene Tunney for the heavyweight title.

Professional boxing record
All information in this section is derived from BoxRec, unless otherwise stated.

Official record

All newspaper decisions are officially regarded as “no decision” bouts and are not counted in the win/loss/draw column.

Unofficial record

Record with the inclusion of newspaper decisions in the win/loss/draw column.

See also

List of heavyweight boxing champions
List of The Ring world champions
List of undisputed boxing champions
International Boxing Hall of Fame
Boxing in the 1920s
List of people on the cover of Time magazine (30 August 1926)

References

External links

https://boxrec.com/media/index.php/NBA_World_Heavyweight_Title_Fights
https://boxrec.com/media/index.php/NYSAC_World_Heavyweight_Title_Fights

Gene Tunney profile at Cyber Boxing Zone
Boxing Hall of Fame
ESPN.com

1897 births
1978 deaths
American male boxers
United States Marine Corps personnel of World War I
United States Navy personnel of World War II
American people of Irish descent
International Boxing Hall of Fame inductees
Lauder Greenway Family
Military personnel from New York City
People associated with physical culture
Sportspeople from Greenwich, Connecticut
Boxers from New York City
Sportspeople from Stamford, Connecticut
The Ring (magazine) champions
United States Marines
Writers from New York City
World heavyweight boxing champions
United States Navy captains
United States Navy reservists
Connecticut National Guard personnel